Émile Amann (4 June 1880, Pont-à-Mousson – 11 January 1948, Strasbourg) was a French historian of the Church.

After studying at the major seminary of Nancy, Émile Amann continued his training at the Catholic Institute in Paris. He was mobilized in 1914 and fought during the four years of First World War. After his demobilization, he joined the faculty of Catholic theology of the University of Strasbourg (re-founded after the return to France of the three departments annexed in 1870), where he taught the ancient history of the Church until his death.

He is notable for his collaboration with the Dictionnaire de théologie catholique, from 1922 to his death.

Works 
1910: Le Protévangile de Jacques et ses remaniements latins
1903: Les actes de Paul et ses épîtres apocryphes
1902: Les actes de Pierre
1920: Le Dogme catholique dans les Pères de l’Église
1928: L’Église des premiers siècles
1938: L'époque carolingienne
1940: L’Église au pouvoir. Les laïcs

References 
Annonce de la mort de Émile Amann dans la Revue des Sciences Religieuses, 1948, vol. 22, n°1, p. 5-8.

External links

20th-century French historians
Historians of Christianity
French historians of religion
1880 births
People from Pont-à-Mousson
1948 deaths
Academic staff of the University of Strasbourg
Institut Catholique de Paris alumni